The House of Marwitz or von der Marwitz is the name of one of the oldest German noble family from Brandenburg, whose members occupied significant positions in the Kingdom of Prussia and later within the German Empire.

History 
The family history begins in 1259 with Theodoricus de Marwiz. It originates from the village of Marwitz, Neumark, which was the German name of what is today Marwice, Lubusz Voivodeship, in western Poland.

Notable members 
Bernhard von der Marwitz (1824–1880), Politician
Friedrich August Ludwig von der Marwitz (1777–1837), General and politician
Georg von der Marwitz (1856–1929), General
Georg Wilhelm von der Marwitz (ca. 1723–1759), Major, quartermaster, and adjutant
Gustav Ludwig von der Marwitz (1730–1797), General
Hans-Georg von der Marwitz (1893–1925), World War I pilot 
Hans-Georg von der Marwitz (born 1961), German politician (CDU)
Heinrich Karl von der Marwitz (1680–1744), General
Joachim von der Marwitz (1603–1662), public servant
Johann Friedrich Adolf von der Marwitz (1723–1781), General
Johannes Nepomuk von der Marwitz (1795–1886), Bishop of Culm
Ralf von der Marwitz (1888–1966), Navy Officer
Siegmund von der Marwitz (1586–1660), public servant

References

Marwitz family